Zarcinia melanozestas is a moth in the family Plutellidae. It is found in Russia.

The wingspan is 17–19 mm. The forewings are whitish-grey-ochreous or whitish-ochreous-grey with seven or eight dots along the costa. The hindwings are pale grey or whitish grey.

References

Moths described in 1935
Plutellidae